The Bell 206 is a family of two-bladed, single- and twin-engined helicopters, manufactured by Bell Helicopter at its Mirabel, Quebec, plant. Originally developed as the Bell YOH-4 for the United States Army's Light Observation Helicopter program, it was not selected by the Army. Bell redesigned the airframe and successfully marketed the aircraft commercially as the five-place Bell 206A JetRanger. The new design was eventually selected by the Army as the OH-58 Kiowa.

Bell also developed a seven-place LongRanger, which was later offered with a twin-engined option as the TwinRanger, while Tridair Helicopters offers a similar conversion of the LongRanger called the Gemini ST. The ICAO-assigned model designation "B06" is used on flight plans for the JetRanger and LongRanger, and the designation "B06T" is used for the twin-engined TwinRangers.

Development

Origins and JetRanger

On October 14, 1960, the United States Navy solicited responses from 25 aircraft manufacturers to a request for proposals (RFP) on behalf of the Army for the Light Observation Helicopter (LOH). Bell entered the competition along with 12 other manufacturers, including Hiller Aircraft and Hughes Tool Co., Aircraft Division. Bell submitted the D-250 design, which would be designated as the YHO-4. On May 19, 1961, Bell and Hiller were announced as winners of the design competition.

Bell developed the D-250 design into the Bell 206 aircraft, redesignated as YOH-4A in 1962, and produced five prototype aircraft for the Army's test and evaluation phase. The first prototype flew on December 8, 1962. The YOH-4A also came to be known as "The Ugly Duckling" in comparison to the other contending aircraft. Following a fly-off of the Bell, Hughes and Fairchild-Hiller prototypes, the Hughes OH-6 was selected in May 1965.

When the YOH-4A was eliminated by the Army, Bell went about solving the problem of marketing the aircraft. In addition to the image problem, the helicopter lacked cargo space and only provided cramped seating for the planned three passengers. The solution was a redesigned fuselage, sleeker and aesthetically appealing, adding 16 ft3 (0.45 m3) of cargo space in the process. A Bell executive contributed to this redesign by drawing on a sketch two lines extending the fuselage to where it meets the tail. The redesign was designated Bell 206A, and Bell President Edwin J. Ducayet named it the JetRanger, denoting an evolution from the popular Model 47J Ranger.

Bell Helicopter ended production of the Bell 206B-3 version in 2010. In 2011, used 206B-3s sold for around $1.4 million depending upon the equipment and configuration.  Bell intends for the Bell 505 Jet Ranger X to replace the 206 five-seat versions from around 2015 and compete with the Robinson R66.

LongRanger

The 206L LongRanger is a stretched variant with seating for seven. Since 1975, Bell has produced more than 1,700 LongRangers across all variant types. In 1981, a military version, the 206L TexasRanger was released. The original 206L used an Allison 250-C20B engine, and a series of model upgrades replaced this engine with more powerful versions; the 206L-1 used a 250-C28, and the 206L-3 and 206L-4 used the 250-C30P.

In both applications, the 250-C30P is derated from 650 hp for takeoff and 501 hp continuous. The 206L-3 is transmission-limited to 435 hp for take-off, and the 206L-4 is transmission-limited to 495 hp. The derating of the C30P produces an advantage in hot-day and high-altitude operations as it can produce the rated horsepower at higher altitudes and temperatures where applications that use the maximum rating of the engine at sea level suffer accelerated performance deterioration with increases in temperature and altitude. The 206L-3 and L-4 have not been offered in a twin configuration under those model designations.

In 2007, Bell announced an upgrade program for the 206L-1 and 206L-3 which is designed to modify the aircraft to the 206L-4 configuration; modified aircraft are designated 206L-1+ and 206L-3+. Modifications include strengthened airframe structural components (including a new tailboom), improved transmission, upgraded engine for the L-1, all of which result in a maximum gross weight increase of 300 pounds and increased performance.

Production of the 206L-4 ended in June 2017.

Gemini ST and TwinRanger
The TwinRanger name dates from the mid-1980s when Bell developed the Bell 400 TwinRanger, but it never entered production.

In 1989, Tridair Helicopters began developing a twin-engine conversion of the LongRanger, the Gemini ST. The prototype's first flight was on January 16, 1991, while full FAA certification was awarded in November. Certification covers the conversion of LongRanger 206L-1s, L-3s and L-4s to Gemini ST configuration. In mid-1994 the Gemini ST was certificated as the first Single/Twin aircraft, allowing it to operate either as a single or twin engine aircraft throughout all phases of flight.

The Bell 206LT TwinRanger was a new-build production model equivalent to Tridair's Gemini ST, and was based on the 206L-4. Thirteen 206LTs were built, the first being delivered in January 1994, and the last in 1997. The TwinRanger was replaced in Bell's lineup by the mostly-new Bell 427.

Operational history

The first Bell 206A flew on January 10, 1966, and the aircraft was revealed later that month at the Helicopter Association of America (HAA) convention. On October 20, 1966, the JetRanger received FAA certification. Delivery of the JetRanger to customers began on January 13, 1967, with the first aircraft being purchased by Harry Holly, CEO of the Hollymatic Corporation and previous owner of a Bell Ranger. In 1968, the United States Navy selected the 206A as its primary trainer, the TH-57 Sea Ranger. The Army also eventually selected the 206A for a light observation helicopter as the OH-58 Kiowa.

The basic shape and design of the JetRanger remained unchanged since 1967, but Bell introduced the 206B JetRanger II in 1971. In 1977, the 206B-3 JetRanger III was introduced with its modified tail rotor and more powerful engine. The JetRanger is popular with news media for traffic and news reporting. The LongRanger is commonly used as an air ambulance and as a corporate transport. On September 1, 1982, pilots H. Ross Perot, Jr. and Jay Coburn departed Dallas, Texas in the "Spirit of Texas", a Bell 206L-2 (N3911Z). They returned on 30 September, 29 days and 3 hours later, completing the first around-the-world helicopter flight.

In 1983, Australian businessman Dick Smith became the first helicopter pilot to complete a solo trip around the world in 260 flight hours. During the trip, he landed his 206B-3 (S/N 3653; VH-DIK) on prepositioned container ships to refuel between Japan and the Aleutian Islands.

In 1993, the U.S. Army chose the Bell 206B-3 as the winner of the New Training Helicopter competition, to serve as its primary training helicopter, the TH-67 Creek. The number of TH-67s being divested by the Army is too small to impact civilian markets.

On July 22, 1994, Ron Bower landed his 206B-3 (N206AJ) at Hurst, Texas, setting a new record for around-the-world flight by a helicopter. Bower had departed on June 24 and returned 24 days, 4 hours, 36 minutes and 24 seconds later, averaging 35.62 knots (40.99 mph, 65.97 km/h). Bower had added a  auxiliary fuel tank, which doubled the JetRanger III's range.

Notable accidents and incidents 
On August 1, 1977, famous U-2 spy plane pilot Francis Gary Powers was piloting a helicopter for KNBC Channel 4 over West Los Angeles, California, when the aircraft crashed, killing him and cameraman George Spears. They had been video recording brush fires in Santa Barbara County in the station's helicopter and were leaving the area.

On August 27, 1990, musician Stevie Ray Vaughan, pilot Jeff Brown, and three members of Eric Clapton's crew, Bobby Brooks, Nigel Browne, and Colin Smythe, were killed in a 206B crash.

On October 25, 1991, a Bell 206 carrying rock music concert promoter Bill Graham, his girlfriend Melissa Gold, and pilot Steve Kahn crashed into a transmission tower west of Vallejo, California, killing everyone on board. The cause of the accident was determined to be the pilot's intentional flight into known adverse weather conditions.

On March 9, 2009, Bangladesh Army's General Officer, Commander of Jessore Area and his pilot was killed when his Bell 206 crashed at Tangail Area of Bangladesh.

On August 20, 2014, Guatemala's Army Chief of Staff was killed when his Bell 206 crashed.

On February 11, 2019, Brazilian journalist Ricardo Boechat and the pilot were killed when Bell 206B, PT-HPG, crashed into a truck while attempting an emergency landing on a highway.

Variants

Civilian

Bell 206 Five YOH-4A prototypes, for flight evaluation in the Army's LOH program (1963).
Bell 206A Initial production version, powered by an Allison 250-C18 turboshaft engine. FAA-certified in 1966. Selected as the OH-58A Kiowa in 1968.
Agusta-Bell 206A License-built in Italy.
Bell 206A-1 OH-58A aircraft that are modified for FAA civil certification.
Agusta-Bell 206A-1 License-built in Italy.
 Upgraded Allison 250-C20 engine.
Agusta-Bell 206B License-built in Italy.
Bell 206B-2 Bell 206B models upgraded with Bell 206B-3 improvements.

Bell 206B-3 Upgraded Allison 250-C20J engine and added  to tail rotor diameter for yaw control.
 Stretched, seven-seat configuration, powered by an Allison 250-C20B turboshaft engine.
 Higher-powered version, powered by an Allison 250-C28 turboshaft engine.
Bell 206L-1+ LongRanger Bell modifications, including 250-C30P engine, to upgrade aircraft to 206L-4 configuration.
 Powered by an Allison 250-C30P turboshaft engine.
Bell 206L-3+ LongRanger Bell modifications to upgrade aircraft to 206L-4 configuration.
 Improved version, 250-C30P engine and transmission upgrade.
Bell 206LT TwinRanger Twin-engined conversions and new-builds of the 206L; replaced by the Bell 427.

Bell 407 based on the 206L with four-blade rotor system.
Bell 417 upgraded 407 with larger engine; project canceled.
 Chilean modified LongRanger III with narrow forward fuselage and flat-plate cockpit windows. At least two converted, with first flight in 1989.
HESA Shahed 278 An Iranian re-hash of Bell 206 components.
Aurora Flight Sciences Tactical Autonomous Aerial Logistics System test platform

Military
Bell 206AS Export version for the Chilean Navy.
 Canadian military designation for the Bell 206B-3.
Hkp 6A Swedish Army designation for the Agusta-Bell 206A. 21 units manufactured in Italy, used as training, liaison, light transport, scout and anti-tank helicopters armed with ATGMs.
Hkp 6B Swedish Navy designation for the Agusta-Bell 206A. 10 units manufactured in Italy, used as anti-submarine helicopters, armed with depth charges. This variant was equipped with emergency inflatable floats.
OH-58 Kiowa Light observation helicopter that replaced the OH-6A Cayuse.
TH-57A Sea Ranger 40 commercial Bell 206A aircraft purchased as the primary U.S. Navy helicopter trainer in January 1968 for training prospective U.S. Navy, U.S. Marine Corps, U.S. Coast Guard and select NATO/Allied helicopter pilots.

206L TexasRanger proposed export military version. One demonstrator was built (1981).
TH-57B 45 commercial Bell 206B-3 helicopters purchased by the US Navy in 1989 as replacements for the TH-57A for primary training under visual flight rules.
TH-57C Sea Ranger 71 commercial Bell 206B-3 helicopters purchased by the US Navy beginning prior to 1985 with cockpits configured for advanced training under instrument flight rules.
TH-57D Planned upgrade program to convert US Navy TH-57B and TH-57C aircraft to a single standard digital cockpit. This program never materialized in operational aircraft.
TH-67 Creek 137 commercial Bell 206B-3s purchased in 1993 as the primary and instrument helicopter trainer for the US Army at Fort Rucker, Alabama. 35 in VFR configuration and 102 in IFR configuration. The US Army currently has 181 units, of which 121 are in VFR configuration and 60 are in IFR configuration. All TH-67s display US registrations ("N" numbers) and are operated as public use aircraft.

Operators

The Bell 206 has been popular for all types of uses both commercial and private.

Military and government

Albanian Air Force

Argentine Army Aviation

Bangladesh Air Force
 Bangladesh Army

 Brazilian Air Force
 Brazilian Navy

Bulgarian Air Force

 Royal Brunei Air Force

 Cameroon Air Force

 Chilean Air Force
 Chilean Navy

 Colombian Air Force
National Police of Colombia

 Air Force of the Democratic Republic of the Congo

 Croatian Air Force
Croatian Police

 Cyprus Air Command

 Ecuadorian Air Force
 Ecuadorian Navy

 Finnish Border Guard

Greek Army

Guatemalan Air Force

 Guyana Defence Force

 Islamic Republic of Iran Air Force
 Islamic Republic of Iran Army

 Iraqi Air Force

 Israeli Air Force

 Italian Army
 Vigili del Fuoco

 Jamaica Defence Force

 Japan Coast Guard

 Latvian State Border Guard

 Lesotho Defence Force

 North Macedonia Air Brigade

 Mexican Air Force

Royal Moroccan Air Force

Royal Air Force of Oman

 Pakistan Army

Peruvian Navy

Polish Police

 Serbian Ministry of the Interior

 Slovenian Air Force and Air Defence
 Slovenian national police force

 Sri Lanka Air Force

 Republic of China Army

 Royal Thai Army
 Royal Thai Police

 Turkish Army

Ugandan Air Force

Chicago Police Department
San Juan County Sheriff Dept.

 Los Angeles Police Department
Memphis Police Department
 Omaha Police Department
 King County Sheriff's Office
 New Jersey State Trooper
 United States Army
 United States Navy
United States Department of the Interior

 Venezuelan Army
Venezuelan Navy

Yemeni Air Force

Zambian Air Force

Former operators

 Australian Army
 Royal Australian Navy

 Canadian Forces
Canadian Coast Guard

 Chilean Army

 Indonesian National Police – Retired in 2007

 Jamaica Defence Force

 Armed Forces of Malta

 Swedish Air Force
 Swedish Navy

Specifications (206B-L4 Long Ranger)

Notable appearances in media

See also

References

Citations

Bibliography

External links

 Bell Model 206L-4 page on Bell's site
 Bell Model 206 GlobalSecurity.org
 TH-57 military version at GlobalSecurity.org

1960s United States helicopters
1960s United States civil utility aircraft
1960s Canadian helicopters
1960s Canadian civil utility aircraft
206
Single-turbine helicopters
Aircraft first flown in 1962